Viktorija Kuzjakina (born 1 June 1985) is a Russian female volleyball player, playing as a libero. She is part of the Russia women's national volleyball team.

She competed at the 2009, 2011 and 2015 Women's European Volleyball Championship. 
She participated in the 2015 FIVB Volleyball World Grand Prix.
On club level she plays for VK Omička.

References

1985 births
Living people
Russian women's volleyball players
Place of birth missing (living people)
20th-century Russian women
21st-century Russian women